Lincoln Pioneer Village is a memorial along the Ohio River in Rockport, Spencer County, Indiana to President Abraham Lincoln who lived in the county during his boyhood years. It was built in 1934 and 1935 in the city park by the Works Progress Administration. George Honig, an artist and sculptor from Spencer County, designed the memorial. He also oversaw the building of the pioneer village replica, which was sponsored by the Spencer County Historical Society and the Rockport City Council. It was listed as a historic district on the National Register of Historic Places on April 20, 1998.

Overview
Rockport is the county seat for Spencer County and 17 miles from where Lincoln was raised. In Rockport, Lincoln borrowed books from John Pitcher, a lawyer, and set off with Allen Gentry on flatboat trips to New Orleans.

The village replica was built near the boat landing that Lincoln used for his flatboat trips. A wooden stockade surrounds the village, which contains a replica of the old Little Pigeon Baptist Church, log cabin school house, school, an inn, houses, and a law office. The cabins represent the homes of people that lived in the community (Little Pigeon Creek Community) where Lincoln was raised and is furnished in keeping with the frontier times and lifestyle, including spinning wheels, churns, handmade chairs, iron pans, tables, beds, dishes and other furnishings.

The houses include those of his sister Sarah Lincoln Grigsby and brother-in-law Aaron Grigsby, merchant and farmer James Gentry, and neighbor Josiah Crawford, who employed Abraham and Sarah Lincoln. The Aunt Lepha Mackey Cabin represents the home of the Rockport woman who took in and taught African American children, who would not have otherwise had an education. Mackey's cabin was the site of first school for African American children in southern Indiana. The village also includes a replica of John Pritcher's Rockport law office and the William Jones store.

Buildings
The village buildings include:

 Administration Building and Museum Room
 John Pritcher Law Office
 Azel Dorsey House
 Daniel Grass House
 Aunt Lepha Mackey House
 Gentry Mansion
 Former Home of Rueben Grigsby
 Pigeon Creek Baptist Church
 Brown's Inn
 Lincoln Cabin
 Market and Barter House
 Grandview Blockhouse
 Mr. and Mrs. Josiah Crawford House
 William Jones store

In popular culture
 The movie The Kentuckian was filmed at Lincoln Pioneer Village

See also
 Lincoln Boyhood National Memorial
 Lincoln State Park, state park with Little Pigeon Creek Community buildings
 Little Pigeon Creek Community, where the Lincolns lived 1816-1830

Notes

References

External links
 Lincoln Pioneer Village, GeorgeHonig.org
 Lincoln Pioneer Village, short video of the village

Buildings and structures in Spencer County, Indiana
Abraham Lincoln
History museums in Indiana
Living museums in Indiana
Open-air museums in Indiana
Museums in Spencer County, Indiana
Tourist attractions in Spencer County, Indiana
Historic districts on the National Register of Historic Places in Indiana
National Register of Historic Places in Spencer County, Indiana
Monuments and memorials to Abraham Lincoln in the United States